This is an incomplete list of playwrights from France in chronological order, according to date of birth.

 
Playwrights
Lists of dramatists and playwrights
Lists of writers by nationality
Playwrights